Josep Maria Mauri i Prior (born 21 October 1941) is a Spanish Catholic priest from Catalonia and the current personal representative of the episcopal co-prince of Andorra, Archbishop Joan Enric Vives Sicília.

He was born in 1941 in Alzina de Moror, Pallars Jussà, Spain and was ordained a priest in 1965. In 2010, he was appointed Vicar General of the Diocese of Urgell and Deputy of the then personal representative of the episcopal co-prince of Andorra, Nemesi Marqués Oste. On 20 July 2012 he was sworn into office as personal representative.

See also
List of national leaders
Politics of Andorra

References

External links

1941 births
Living people
Spanish Roman Catholic priests
Politics of Andorra